Onise Bughadze (born 12 January 1991) is a Georgian judoka.

He is the bronze medallist of the 2017 Judo Grand Slam Baku in the +100 kg category.

References

External links
 

1991 births
Living people
Male judoka from Georgia (country)
21st-century people from Georgia (country)